The 2000 Wimbledon Championships was a tennis tournament played on grass courts at the All England Lawn Tennis and Croquet Club in Wimbledon, London in the United Kingdom. It was the 114th edition of the Wimbledon Championships and was held from 26 June to 9 July 2000. It was the third Grand Slam tennis event of the year.

Pete Sampras won his fourth consecutive Wimbledon title, defeating Pat Rafter in the final. It was also his last Wimbledon title. Lindsay Davenport was unsuccessful in her title defence, being defeated by Venus Williams in the women's final. It was the first of five Wimbledon titles for Venus Williams.

Millennium celebrations
In order to celebrate the millennium, the All England Club invited all surviving singles champions, any player that had appeared in two or more singles finals without winning the championship, and any player who had won four or more doubles titles, to a presentation ceremony on Centre Court on Saturday, July 1. Each honouree was presented with a crystal plate, engraved with their name, by the President of the Lawn Tennis Association, Her Royal Highness The Duchess of Gloucester. Those who attended were (in order of presentation): Singles champion Andre Agassi; Doubles champions: Ken McGregor, Bob Hewitt, Ken Fletcher, Tony Roche, Rosie Casals, Owen Davidson, Frew McMillan, Peter Fleming, Pam Shriver, Helena Suková, Natasha Zvereva, Gigi Fernández; Singles finalists: Henry "Bunny" Austin, Kurt Nielsen, Ken Rosewall, Darlene Hard, Fred Stolle, Hana Mandlíková, Goran Ivanišević; Singles champions: Sidney Wood, Pauline Betz, Bob Falkenburg, Ted Schroeder, John "Budge" Patty, Richard "Dick" Savitt, Frank Sedgman, Elias "Vic" Seixas, Jaroslav Drobný, Marion "Tony" Trabert, Shirley Fry Irvin, Ashley Cooper, Maria Bueno, Alejandro "Alex" Olmedo, Neale Fraser, Angela Mortimer, Rod Laver, Margaret Smith Court, Roy Emerson, Billie Jean King, Manuel Santana, John Newcombe, Ann Jones, Evonne Goolagong Cawley, Stan Smith, Jan Kodeš, Chris Evert, Björn Borg, Virginia Wade, Martina Navratilova, John McEnroe, Boris Becker, Patrick "Pat" Cash, Steffi Graf, Stefan Edberg, Michael Stich, Conchita Martínez, Jana Novotná and Lindsay Davenport. Andre Agassi was presented first in order to accommodate his match schedule. Other attendees were then presented with their commemoration later in the same day in the Royal Box: Doubles champions: Mark Woodforde, Todd Woodbridge; Singles finalist: Arantxa Sánchez Vicario; and Singles champions: Martina Hingis and Pete Sampras. Several post war champions were absent, but the only champions from the open era (post 1968) not to attend were Jimmy Connors and Richard Krajicek. Both Ilie Năstase and Ivan Lendl were also invited as two-time singles finalist, but did not attend. The inclusion of singles finalists and the exclusion of doubles champions who had not won at least four titles was mildly controversial, with Frew McMillan bemoaning to BBC Radio that his two-time mixed doubles championship partner Betty Stöve had not been invited, despite the Dutch woman holding three Wimbledon doubles titles and having reached the singles final once; whereas Hana Mandlíková and Goran Ivanišević both attended, neither one of whom had ever won a Wimbledon title of any kind prior to Wimbledon 2000.

Prize money
The total prize money for 2000 championships was £8,056,480. The winner of the men's title earned £477,500 while the women's singles champion earned £430,000.

* per team

Champions

Seniors

Men's singles

 Pete Sampras defeated  Pat Rafter, 6–7(10-12), 7–6(7-5), 6–4, 6–2 
 It was Sampras's 2nd title of the year, and his 63rd overall. It was his 13th career Grand Slam title (a record until Roger Federer surpassed him in 2009), and his 7th (and last) Wimbledon title (a record, tied with William Renshaw, and subsequently surpassed by Federer in 2017)

Women's singles

 Venus Williams defeated  Lindsay Davenport, 6–3, 7–6(7-3) 
 It was Williams's 1st title of the year, and her 10th overall. It was her 1st career Grand Slam title.

Men's doubles

 Todd Woodbridge /  Mark Woodforde defeated  Paul Haarhuis /  Sandon Stolle, 6–3, 6–4, 6–1

Women's doubles

 Serena Williams /  Venus Williams defeated  Julie Halard-Decugis /  Ai Sugiyama, 6–3, 6–2

Mixed doubles

 Donald Johnson /  Kimberly Po defeated  Lleyton Hewitt /  Kim Clijsters, 6–4, 7–6(7-3)

Juniors

Boys' singles

 Nicolas Mahut defeated  Mario Ančić, 3–6, 6–3, 7–5

Girls' singles

 María Emilia Salerni defeated  Tatiana Perebiynis, 6–4, 7–5

Boys' doubles

 Dominique Coene /  Kristof Vliegen defeated  Andrew Banks /  Benjamin Riby, 6–3, 1–6, 6–3

Girls' doubles

 Ioana Gașpar /  Tatiana Perebiynis defeated  Dája Bedáňová /  María Emilia Salerni, 7–6(7-2), 6–3

Singles players
Men's singles

Women's singles

Singles seeds

Men's singles
  Pete Sampras (champion)
  Andre Agassi (semifinals, lost to Pat Rafter)
  Magnus Norman (second round, lost to Olivier Rochus)
  Gustavo Kuerten (third round, lost to Alexander Popp)
  Yevgeny Kafelnikov (second round, lost to Thomas Johansson)
  Cédric Pioline (second round, lost to Vladimir Voltchkov)
  Lleyton Hewitt (first round, lost to Jan-Michael Gambill)
  Tim Henman (fourth round, lost to Mark Philippoussis)
  Thomas Enqvist (fourth round, lost to Jan-Michael Gambill)
  Mark Philippoussis (quarterfinals, lost to Andre Agassi)
  Richard Krajicek (second round, lost to Wayne Ferreira)
  Pat Rafter (final, lost to Pete Sampras)
  Nicolas Kiefer (first round, lost to Tommy Haas)
  Greg Rusedski (first round, lost to Vince Spadea)
  Marat Safin (second round, lost to Martin Damm)
  Nicolás Lapentti '(first round, lost to Ctislav Doseděl)Women's singles
  Martina Hingis (quarterfinals, lost to Venus Williams)  Lindsay Davenport (final, lost to Venus Williams)  Mary Pierce (second round, lost to Magüi Serna)  Conchita Martínez (second round, lost to Sonya Jeyaseelan)  Venus Williams (champion)
  Monica Seles (quarterfinals, lost to Lindsay Davenport)  Nathalie Tauziat (first round, lost to Kim Clijsters)  Serena Williams (semifinals, lost to Venus Williams)  Arantxa Sánchez Vicario (fourth round, lost to Monica Seles)  Sandrine Testud (first round, lost to Anna Kournikova)  Anke Huber (fourth round, lost to Martina Hingis)  Amanda Coetzer (second round, lost to Lilia Osterloh)  Amélie Mauresmo (first round, lost to Gala León García)  Julie Halard-Decugis (first round, lost to Kristie Boogert)  Barbara Schett (first round, lost to Olga Barabanschikova)  Dominique Van Roost (first round, lost to Jennifer Capriati)''

References

External links
 Official Wimbledon Championships website

 
Wimbledon Championships
Wimbledon Championships
Wimbledon Championships
Wimbledon Championships